Lyssacinosida  is an order of glass sponges belonging to the subclass Hexasterophora. These sponges can be recognized by the parenchymal spicules usually being unconnected, unlike in other sponges in the subclass where the spicules form a more or less tightly connected skeleton.

Sources

Identification key for Lyssacinosa

Hexactinellida
Sponge orders